Irreligion in New Zealand refers to atheism, agnosticism, deism, religious scepticism and secular humanism in New Zealand society. Post-war New Zealand has become a highly secular country, meaning that religion does not play a major role in the lives of many of the population.

Although New Zealand has no established religion, Christianity had been the most common religion since widespread European settlement in the 19th century.

Demographics

Statistics New Zealand gathers information on religious affiliation in the five-yearly census. Completing a census form is compulsory by law for every person in New Zealand on census night but respondents are able to object to answering the question of religious affiliation, and around 6% do object. The trend shows an increasing proportion of residents in New Zealand declaring no religious affiliation. In the 1991 census, 20.2% were in this category. The proportion more than doubled in two decades, reaching 41.9% in the 2013 census, and increased again to 48.2% in the 2018 census, when for the first time a plurality of New Zealanders claimed "no religion".

There is significant debate among sociologists about the interpretation of this trend in census data. The increase in those indicating 'no religion' is often cited in support of the secularisation thesis. An alternative theory is that the data indicates a decline in institutional religious affiliation rather than simply a decrease in spiritual belief. A 1985 survey showed that around one-quarter of those answering 'no religion' may believe in a god and that, conversely, between 7 percent and 36 percent of Christians (depending on their denomination) did not believe in the existence of deities.

The International Social Survey Programme was conducted in New Zealand by Massey University in 2008. It received mail-responses from around one thousand New Zealanders above the age of 18, surveying issues of religious belief and practice. The results of this survey indicated that 72% of the population believed in a god or a higher power, 15% were agnostic, and 13% were atheist (with a 3% margin of error).

According to a report by the American Physical Society, religion may die out in New Zealand and eight other Western world countries.

As of the 2018 census, those who did not affiliate with a religion outnumbered those with a religion for the first time.

Irreligion in society

The Humanist Society of New Zealand  and the New Zealand Association of Rationalists and Humanists promote a secular view of life without reference to supernatural agencies as one of their aims.

A campaign to create advertisements similar to the Atheist Bus Campaign in the United Kingdom began a fund-raising drive on 10 December 2009, and reached its initial target of $10,000 in donations within 48 hours, making it one of the most successful atheist campaigns of all time.

Māori and other ethnic groups 
Te Ara: The Encyclopedia of New Zealand notes, in 2013 "47% of people who identified themselves as Europeans or New Zealanders said they had no religion – as did 46% of Māori and 30% of Asians. Only 18% of Pacific peoples, and 17% of people in the Middle Eastern, Latin American and African ethnic groups, said they had no religion."

See also
 Religion in New Zealand
 Blasphemy law in New Zealand
 Demographics of atheism

References

External links
  Statistics New Zealand – Religion page

New Zealand